Anomalepis aspinosus is a species of snake in the Anomalepididae family. It is endemic to Peru.

References

Anomalepididae
Snakes of South America
Reptiles of Peru
Endemic fauna of Peru
Reptiles described in 1939